Pennsylvania's 23rd congressional district was one of Pennsylvania's districts of the United States House of Representatives.

History
This district was created in 1833. The district was eliminated in 1993.

List of members representing the district

References

 
 
 Congressional Biographical Directory of the United States 1774–present

23
Former congressional districts of the United States
Constituencies established in 1833
1833 establishments in Pennsylvania
Constituencies disestablished in 1993
1993 disestablishments in Pennsylvania